Karl O'Donnell, Count of Tyrconnel (1715–1771) held important commands in the Austrian army during the Seven Years' War. Between 1768 and 1770, he was governor of Transylvania.

Biography
O'Donnell held important commands during the Third Silesian War between Prussia and Austria, during the Seven Years' War, up to the rank of general.

Family
O'Donnell was a descendant of the Irish noble dynasty of O'Donnell of Tyrconnell who left Ireland after the Battle of the Boyne and settled in Austria.

Descendants
A descendant Maximilian Karl Lamoral O'Donnell was a notable figure in the history of the Italian and Hungarian campaigns of 1848 and 1849, and achieved fame for helping to save the life of Emperor Franz Josef I during an assassination attempt in 1853.

Henry Joseph O'Donnell, Count of La Bisbal (1769–1834) was from another branch of the family, a member of the Irish noble dynasty of O'Donnell of Tyrconnell who left Ireland after the Battle of the Boyne; he was a general in the Spanish Army during the Napoleonic Wars.

References

Attribution

1715 births
1771 deaths
Counts of the Holy Roman Empire
Austrian people of Irish descent
Wild Geese (soldiers)
Karl
Generals of the Holy Roman Empire
Grand Crosses of the Military Order of Maria Theresa